Charles Baillie-Hamilton may refer to:

Charles Baillie-Hamilton (Aylesbury MP) (1800–1865), MP for Aylesbury
Charles Baillie-Hamilton (Bath MP) (1900–1939), MP for Bath
Charles R. Baillie-Hamilton (1848–1927), played football for Scotland in 1870 
Charles Baillie-Hamilton (priest) (1764–1820), English Anglican priest

See also
Charles Baillie (disambiguation)
Charles Hamilton (disambiguation)